Ranum is a town in the community of Løgstør and the Vesthimmerland Municipality in Denmark. It is the fifth largest town in Vesthimmerland municipality and situated approximately 3 km from the Fiord, Limfjorden and 1 hour from the two major cities Aalborg and Viborg. Ranum has a population of 969 (1 January 2022).

History 
Ranum was established around the year 1100 and has been an attractive village throughout the last millennium. Ranum is famous for its educational heritage. The first teaching college (lærer seminarium) was established in 1848. The college was closed in 1994 and the historic premises is today a part of Ranum Efterskole. Ranum Efterskole is one of the largest efterskoles in Denmark, boarding and teaching more than 400 students every year.

Vildsted Lake, one of Denmark's biggest nature rehabilitation projects, is located next to the Ranum. Vildsted Lake and meadows covers in total 913 hectares and was established (re-created) in 2002–2006. Vildsted Lake is a unique nature resort and resting place for migrating birds.

External links
The local volunteer Residents and Business Interest community

References

Cities and towns in the North Jutland Region
Vesthimmerland Municipality